Bridget Lowe is an American poet. 

In an early interview, Lowe expressed her interest in and commitment to “figures who are rejected by the same social groups for which they are expected to perform.” The Poetry Foundation elaborates “Her poetry is accordingly concerned with those who feel they are both looked at and invisible, who are exploited yet remain deeply unknown.”

Biography 
Bridget Lowe was born in Kansas City, Missouri. She is the author of two collections of poetry with Carnegie Mellon University Press: At the Autopsy of Vaslav Nijinsky in 2013, followed by My Second Work in 2020. Her work has appeared in numerous publications including The New Yorker, Poetry, The New Republic, Parnassus, and the American Poetry Review. Her work has also appeared in the Best American Poetry anthology.

Awards 
While a student at Syracuse University’s MFA program, Lowe was awarded a Discovery/Boston Review Prize from the 92Y. In 2015, Lowe was awarded the Writer Magazine/Emily Dickinson Award from the Poetry Society of America. She is also a recipient of a fellowship to the Bread Loaf Writer’s Conference and a Rona Jaffee Foundation fellowship to MacDowell.

Critical reception 
In an early feature on her work at Gwarlingo, Michelle Aldredge noted that Lowe's poems are "lyrics and elegies from material as disparate as science, history, and pop culture. The poems ... feel simultaneously contemporary and very 19th century."

In the Kenyon Review, Lucy Biederman wrote: "There is bravery in Lowe's focus on emotions besides love and hate, in the rigor and ruthlessness with which she describes, instead, disappointment, disgust, humiliation, and mild surprise ... The poems in this book go deep, beyond the beauty and the ugliness, as T.S. Eliot instructs, to 'the boredom, and the horror, and the glory.'"

Her work has also been reviewed in Publishers Weekly, Green Mountains Review, 32 Poems, and The Collagist.

Works 
At the Autopsy of Vaslav Nijinsky (Carnegie Mellon University Press, 2013) 
My Second Work (Carnegie Mellon University Press, 2020)

References 

Living people
Writers from Kansas City, Missouri
21st-century American women writers
American women poets
Poets from Missouri
Year of birth missing (living people)